Throughout history, lockstitch sewing machines have used a variety of methods to drive their bobbins so as to create the lockstitch.

"Rotating shuttle"

The term rotating shuttle is ambiguous.  Sometimes it refers to a bobbin case, and sometimes it refers to a rotary hook design.

References

Sewing machines